Leanda Cave (born 9 March 1978 in Louth, England) is a retired British triathlete. Cave is the 2002 World Triathlon Champion and the 2012 Ironman Triathlon and Ironman 70.3 World Champion, the first woman in the history of the sport to win both titles in the same year. Cave competed internationally for Wales and Great Britain.

Early and personal life
Cave was born in Louth, Lincolnshire, England. At the age of four Cave's parents (her father was a carpenter) migrated to Queensland, Australia, where she went to school. Returning to England, as her mother is Welsh, she chose to represent Wales. Growing up Cave swam, ran cross country and was a surf lifeguard.

In February 2013, Cave was diagnosed with skin cancer.

Career
Cave entered her first triathlon at the encouragement of her sister, who already participated in them.

In 2001 Cave became European Under-23 champion. A year later she would internationally break through at the senior level as she won the silver medal at the 2002 Commonwealth Games in Manchester. She won another silver medal at the European Championships, then had greater success when she took the gold and the World title in Cancún, Mexico in November 2002. In 2002, she was nominated for the Welsh Sports Personality of the Year Award.

Cave struggled with injury in 2003 and was unable to defend her world title, although she did take part in the BBC series Superstars.

Cave won her second world title in 2007 at the ITU Long Distance Triathlon World Championships in Lorient, France. On 28 March 2008, at the Ford Ironman 70.3 California triathlon, Cave came in third place behind Erika Csomor and Mirinda Carfrae. At the 2010 Ironman World Championship 70.3, she took second place.

On 30 April 2011, Cave won the Wildflower Long Course triathlon held at Lake San Antonio, California.  She also has won the Escape from Alcatraz triathlon in San Francisco, most recently on 10 June 2012. Later that year she won her first Ironman event at Ironman Arizona.

On 9 September 2012, at the Ironman 70.3 World Championship, Cave came in first place. On 13 October 2012, at the Ironman World Championship, Cave came in first place. About 3 miles from the finish, Cave overtook Switzerland's Caroline Steffen who had held the lead in the run from the start and then went on to win the race. By winning both the 70.3 world championship and the Ironman World Championship in the same year, Cave became the first woman to ever achieve the 'double'. Australia's Craig Alexander accomplished this feat on the men's side in 2011.

Cave struggled with injury in 2013 and though she made the start line in both events, she finished 12th in both the 70.3 and Ironman World Championships.

In 2014, Cave started the year focusing on short course triathlons in a bid to make the Team Wales Commonwealth Games Squad, which despite a series of good results in qualifying competitions, including a win at Valparaiso ITU World Cup on 30 March 2014, ended with her non-selection for the games.

Cave won Ironman Sweden 2014, finishing with the fastest times in all three disciplines.

References

External links
 Official website
 Triathlon.org Profile

1978 births
Living people
People from Louth, Lincolnshire
Welsh female triathletes
English female triathletes
Ironman world champions
Commonwealth Games silver medallists for Wales
Triathletes at the 2002 Commonwealth Games
Triathletes at the 2006 Commonwealth Games
British expatriates in Australia
British expatriates in the United States
Commonwealth Games medallists in triathlon
English people of Welsh descent
Sportspeople from Lincolnshire
Sportswomen from Queensland
Australian female triathletes
Triathlon coaches
Medallists at the 2002 Commonwealth Games